This article is a summary of 1980 in Australian television.

Events
 20 January - The 0/10 Network became known as Network Ten to reflect ATV moving from Channel 0 to channel 10.
 30 January - Australian sitcom Kingswood Country (a spinoff of the Australian comedy sketch series The Naked Vicar Show) starring Ross Higgins premieres on Seven Network.
 10 May - Seven Network airs the final episode of the Australian comedy series Doctor Down Under.
 27 May - British comedy drama series Minder premieres on ABC.
 14 July - A remake of the 1970s Australian game show Great Temptation called Sale of the Century premieres on Nine Network and becomes the biggest hit of the year. Tony Barber who has previously hosted Great Temptation will return to host this remake along with new co-host Victoria Nicolls.
 August - TV Times and TV Guide magazines are amalgamated into TV Week.
 11 August - Canadian sceptic James Randi was interviewed by Don Lane which ended with a fight about elderly psychic Doris Stokes. As he went to a commercial break he fired Randi from the show, telling him to p**s off.
 4 September - Australian drama miniseries The Timeless Land debuts on ABC.
 September - The Australian Broadcasting Tribunal refuses the takeover of ATV10 by Rupert Murdoch's News Limited.
 24 October - Special Broadcasting Service was launched as Channel 0/28.
 12 November - In the 1980 season finale for Prisoner, Meg Jackson and Bob Morris marry, the Christmas performance and the mineshaft disaster. 
 The 1980 Moscow Olympics are televised on Seven Network via satellite.

Television
 24 October - Channel 0/28

Debuts

New International Programming
 1 January -  The Duke (Seven Network)
 2 January - / Zoom the White Dolphin (ABC TV)
 13 January -  Quark (ABC TV)
 27 January -  240 Robert (Network Ten)
 3 February -  Rebecca (ABC TV)
 5 February -  The Omega Factor (ABC TV)
 7 February -  Telford's Change (ABC TV)
 11 February -  The All-New Popeye Show (Seven Network)
 21 February -  Captain Caveman and the Teen Angels (Seven Network)
 21 February -  The Dukes of Hazzard (Network Ten)
 3 March -  Grange Hill (ABC TV)
 4 April -  A Connecticut Rabbit in King Arthur's Court (Network Ten - Sydney)
 22 April -  Beggarman, Thief (Seven Network)
 26 May -  Fangface (Network Ten)
 27 May -  Minder (ABC TV)
 31 May -  California Fever (Network Ten)
 4 June -  Jason of Star Command (Nine Network)
 22 June -  Scooby and Scrappy-Doo (Nine Network)
 2 July –  The Paper Lads (Nine Network)
 5 July -  Godzilla (Seven Network)
 16 July -  Hagen (Nine Network)
 2 August -  Space Sentinels (Network Ten)
 4 August -  Thunder (Network Ten)
 25 August -  Ballet Shoes (Nine Network)
 9 September -  The Moon Stallion (ABC TV)
 25 September -  Hawkmoor (ABC TV)
 20 October -  Huntingtower (ABC TV)
 3 November -  Pinocchio (ABC TV)
 16 November -  A New Kind of Family (Seven Network)
 17 November -  Beyond Westworld (Seven Network)
 18 November -  Big Shamus, Little Shamus (Seven Network)
 19 November -  Me and Maxx (Network Ten)
 25 November -  Flo (Network Ten)
 26 November -  The Ropers (Seven Network)
 2 December -  Mrs. Columbo (Nine Network)
 3 December -  B.A.D. Cats (Nine Network)
 4 December -  The Plastic Man Comedy/Adventure Show (Network Ten)
 9 December -  Flambards (Nine Network)
 22 December -  The New Fred and Barney Show (Seven Network)
 23 December -  Texas (Network Ten)
 25 December -  Bugs Bunny's Looney Christmas Tales (Network Ten)
 26 December -  Struck by Lightning (Seven Network)

Television shows

1950s
 Mr. Squiggle and Friends (1959–1999)

1960s
 Four Corners (1961–present)

1970s
 Hey Hey It's Saturday (1971–1999, 2009–2010)
 Young Talent Time (1971–1988)
 Countdown (1974–1987)
 The Don Lane Show (1975–1983)
 60 Minutes (1979–present)
 Prisoner (1979–1986)
 Doctor Down Under (1979–1980)

1980s
 Kingswood Country (1980–1984)
 Sale of the Century (1980–2001)
 Arcade (1980)

Ending this year

See also
 1980 in Australia
 List of Australian films of 1980

References